Behala Chowrasta is a metro station of Kolkata Metro Line 3. It is an elevated station, and have side platforms. It was opened in the first phase of this line. The station was commissioned on 30 December 2022.

History 
Purple Line was approved in the railway budget for the financial year 2010-2011 and Rs 2,6519 crore was allocated for the construction work. In October 2011, NVRL won the tender for the construction of the Metro Corridor from Joka Metro Station to Esplanade Metro Station along with the Thakurpukur metro station.

Trial runs on the 6.5-km Joka-Taratla stretch of Kolkata Metro's Purple Line began in mid-September 2022, and it received mandatory Commissioner of Railway Safety (CRS) clearance in November.

Prime Minister Narendra Modi inaugurated the Joka-Taratala stretch, including Joka metro station of Kolkata Metro's Purple Line on 30 December 2022 in the presence of West Bengal Chief Minister Mamata Banerjee and Indian Railway Minister Ashwini Vaishnaw. Some students from schools like St Thomas Boys School were granted the rare opportunity to be the first ones to ride in this Joka-Taratala stretch after the inauguration.

The station

Structure
Behala Chowrasta elevated metro station situated on the Line 3 of Kolkata Metro. It is located exactly above the Behala Chowrasta intersection on Diamond Harbour Road / NH-12.

Electricity and signal systems 
Like the other stations and lines of the Kolkata Metro, this station will use 750 volts DC power supply by the third railway to operate the trains.

Train movement will be conducted at this station and on the railway by communication-based train control signal system. This signal system can operate a 5 second interval train.

References 

Kolkata Metro stations